The Old-Age Pensions Act 1908 is an Act of Parliament of the United Kingdom of Great Britain and Ireland, passed in 1908. The Act is often regarded as one of the foundations of modern social welfare in both the present-day United Kingdom and the Irish Republic and forms part of the wider social welfare reforms of the Liberal Government of 1906–1914.

Successful single claimants over the age of seventy were paid five shillings a week, while couples in which the husband was aged over seventy got seven shillings and sixpence per week.

Outline
The Act provided for a non-contributory old age pension for people over the age of seventy, with the cost being borne by taxpayers generally. It was enacted in 1908 and was to pay a weekly pension of 5s a week (7s 6d for married couples) with effect from 1 January 1909. The level of benefit was deliberately set low – the approximate equivalent of £23 in 21st century terms – to encourage workers to go on making their own provision for retirement. In order to be eligible, claimants had to have an income less than 10s (£31) a year, and also had to pass a 'character test'; only those with a 'good character' could receive the pensions. Claimants also had to have been resident in Great Britain and Ireland for at least twenty years to be eligible, and those who had not worked habitually were also not eligible.

Others excluded from receiving the new pension were those in receipt of poor relief, those being held in what were then called 'lunatic asylums', those who had served a prison sentence and been released less than ten years before, those convicted of drunkenness (at the discretion of the court), and any person who was guilty of ‘habitual failure to work’, according to ability.

Implementation
The pension was due to be paid from 1 January 1909, and those eligible had to apply to a local pension committee starting in October 1908 set up by the county councils. Those eligible had to be over the age of 70, must have been a British subject for 20 years and have resided in the United Kingdom. It was open to both men and women, both married and single, and their "yearly means" could not exceed £31. 10s. Forms for applicants were available from the end of September 1908 and had to be returned to the postmaster of the post office that would pay the individual's benefit. The claims were assessed by the pension officers and then sent to the local pension committee for approval.

On 31 December 1908 a total of 596,038 pensions had been granted:

Effects
Initially, most of the recipients of the pension benefit were women. In order to remove any stigma in receiving the benefit, the scheme was administered by the Post Office rather than the existing social welfare agencies such as the parish or Poor Law.
As Winston Churchill, (with David Lloyd George a major social reformer of the era), said of the pension level, "It is not much unless you have not got it". 
Flora Thompson, who helped administer the first Post Office payouts, has movingly recorded the relief and gratitude of the first recipients: "'God bless that Lord George and God bless you, miss!' and there were flowers from their gardens and apples from their trees for the girl who merely handed them the money".

See also
National Insurance Act 1911
Pension provision in the United Kingdom
Timeline of pensions in the United Kingdom

State pensions acts
Widows', Orphans' and Old Age Contributory Pensions Act 1925
National Insurance Act 1946
National Insurance Act 1965
Social Security Contributions and Benefits Act 1992

Private pensions acts
Superannuation and other Funds (Validation) Act 1992
Pension Schemes Act 1993
Pensions Act 1995
Pensions Act 2004
Pensions Act 2007
Pensions Act 2008

References

External links
Text of the Old-Age Pensions Act 1908 and Regulations

Pensions in the United Kingdom
United Kingdom Acts of Parliament 1908
Social security in the United Kingdom